() is a German public-limited company based in Rastatt in the state of Baden-Württemberg in southwestern Germany. Its chief products are tramway vehicles and railway coaches and wagons. In its early days it also built rolling stock for the Grand Duchy of Baden State Railways.

After the acquisition of the majority of shares by Bauknecht the coach factory in 1971 was converted into a limited liability company (GmbH) and its production was refocussed on the repair and conversion of wagons. After several name changes and takeovers, especially due to the bankruptcy of Bauknecht, it finally became the 'BWR Wagon Repair Company'.

External links 
Website of the present-day BWR Waggonreparatur GmbH with a history of the company 
 

Transport in Baden-Württemberg
Rolling stock manufacturers of Germany